Iwiny may refer to the following places in Poland:
Iwiny, Bolesławiec County in Lower Silesian Voivodeship (south-west Poland)
Iwiny, Wrocław County in Lower Silesian Voivodeship (south-west Poland)
Iwiny, Łódź Voivodeship (central Poland)